Jean Yanne (born Jean Roger Gouyé; 18 July 1933 – 23 May 2003) was a French actor, screenwriter, producer, director and composer. In 1972, he won the Cannes Film Festival Award for Best Actor for his performance in the film We Won't Grow Old Together.

Filmography

Actor

1952: Nez de cuir (directed by Yves Allégret) - Extra (uncredited)
1952: Il est minuit, Docteur Schweitzer (directed by André Haguet) - Extra (uncredited)
1952: Le Chemin de Damas (directed by Max Glass) - Extra (uncredited)
1955: Les Carnets du Major Thompson (directed by Preston Sturges) - Extra (uncredited)
1964: La Vie à l'envers (directed by Alain Jessua) - Monsieur Kerbel
1964: Jealous as a Tiger - Alphonse
1964: Un égale trois 
1964: La Femme spectacle (directed by Claude Lelouch) - Le 'journaliste' (uncredited)
1965: L'amour à la chaîne - Pornotropos
1965: Dis-moi qui tuer - Federucci
1966: Monnaie de singe (directed by Yves Robert) - Félix
1966: Line of Demarcation (directed by Claude Chabrol) - Tricot, l'instituteur
1966: Le Saint prend l'affût - Mueller-Strasse
1967: The Viscount (directed by Maurice Cloche) - Billette
1967: Bang Bang (Les aventures de Sheila !) (directed by Serge Piollet) - Robert Vaucamu alias 'Bob la Rafale'
1967: Week End (directed by Jean-Luc Godard) - Roland Durand
1968: Un drôle de colonel (directed by Jean Girault) - Barton
1968: Ces messieurs de la famille (directed by Raoul André) - Marco Broca
1969: Erotissimo (directed by Gérard Pirès) - Philippe
1969: Que la bête meure (directed by Claude Chabrol) - Paul Decourt
1970: Le Boucher (directed by Claude Chabrol) - Popaul / Paul Thomas
1971:  (directed by Gérard Pirès) - Doc Noonan
1971:  (directed by Georges Lautner) - Serge Aubin
1971: Êtes-vous fiancée à un marin grec ou à un pilote de ligne ? (directed by Jean Aurel) - Roger Blanchard
1971:  (directed by Yves Boisset) - Louis Orsini
1972: Nous ne vieillirons pas ensemble (directed by Maurice Pialat) - Jean
1972: Tout le monde il est beau, tout le monde il est gentil - Christian Gerber
1973: Moi y'en a vouloir des sous - Benoît Lepape
1974: Chinese in Paris - Régis Forneret
1974: Touche pas à la femme blanche (Don't Touch The White Woman!) (directed by Marco Ferreri)
1975: Chobizenesse - Clément Mastard
1977: Armaguedon (directed by Alain Jessua) - Louis Carrier
1977: The Accuser (L'Imprécateur) (directed by Jean-Louis Bertucelli) - Directeur des relations humaines
1977: Moi, fleur bleue (directed by Éric Le Hung) - Max
1978: La Raison d'État (directed by André Cayatte) - Jean-Philippe Leroi
1979: Je te tiens, tu me tiens par la barbichette - Inspecteur Chodaque
1980: Asphalte (directed by Denis Amar) - Arthur Colonna
1982: A Day in a Taxi (Une journée en taxi) (directed by Robert Ménard) - Michel
1982: Deux heures moins le quart avant Jésus-Christ - Paulus
1983: Hanna K. (directed by Costa-Gavras) - Victor Bonnet
1983: Papy fait de la résistance (directed by Jean-Marie Poiré) - Murat
1988: Le téléphone sonne toujours deux fois!! (directed by Jean-Pierre Vergne) - L'homme au téléphone
1985: Liberté, égalité, choucroute - Marat (uncredited)
1986: Le Paltoquet (directed by Michel Deville) - The Police Captain
1986: Oviri - William Molard
1986: Attention bandits! (directed by Claude Lelouch) - L'Expert (Simon Verini)
1987: Fucking Fernand (directed by Gérard Mordillat) - Andre Binet
1987: Cayenne palace (directed by Alain Maline) - L'Équateur
1988:  (directed by Nicolas Gessner) - Inspector Sutter
1990: Le Radeau de la Méduse (directed by Iradj Azimi) - Duroy de Chaumareys
1991: Madame Bovary (directed by Claude Chabrol) - M. Homais - le pharmacien
1991: Les secrets professionnels du Dr Apfelglück - Germain l'escroc
1992:  (directed by Yves Robert) - H 33
1992: Indochine (directed by Régis Wargnier) - Guy
1992: La Sévillane (directed by Jean-Philippe Toussaint) - Polougaievski
1992: L'Affaire Seznec (directed by Yves Boisset) - Quémeneur
1993: Pétain (directed by Jean Marbeuf) - Pierre Laval
1993: La Légende (directed by Jérôme Diamant-Berger) - Roland Pikas
1993: Fausto (directed by Remy Duchemin) - Mietek Breslauer
1993: Chacun pour soi (directed by Jean-Michel Ribes) - Georges Flavier
1993: Profil bas (directed by Claude Zidi) - Plana
1994: Regarde les hommes tomber (directed by Jacques Audiard) - Simon
1995: Le Hussard sur le toit (directed by Jean-Paul Rappeneau) - Le Colporteur
1996: Beaumarchais, l'insolent (directed by Édouard Molinaro) - Louis Goezman
1996: Enfants de salaud (directed by Tonie Marshall) - Julius Mandenne
1996: Désiré (directed by Bernard Murat) - Corniche
1996: Des nouvelles du bon Dieu (directed by Didier Le Pêcheur) - Louis-Albert Dieu
1996: Mo (directed by Yves-Noël François) - Ned Collins
1996: Fallait pas ! (directed by Gérard Jugnot) - Magic
1996: Victory (directed by Mark Peploe) - Mr. Schomberg
1997: Tenue correcte exigée (directed by Philippe Lioret) - M. Brucker - le directeur de l'hôtel
1998: La dame du jeu - Evaristo Della Porta
1999: Hygiène de l'assassin (directed by François Ruggieri) - Prétextat Tach
1999: Belle Maman (directed by Gabriel Aghion) - Paul
1999: Je règle mon pas sur le pas de mon père (directed by Rémi Waterhouse) - Bertrand
2000: Les Acteurs (directed by Bertrand Blier) - Dr. Belgoder
2001: Le Pacte des loups (Brotherhood of the Wolf) (directed by Christophe Gans) - Comte de Morangias
2001: Vertige de l'amour (directed by Laurent Chouchan) - Le beau-père
2002: Adolphe (directed by Benoît Jacquot) - The Count
2002: Féroce (directed by Gilles de Maistre) - Comte de Morangias
2002: Tamango (directed by Jean Roké Patoudem)
2003: Petites Coupures (directed by Pascal Bonitzer) - Gérard, l'oncle de Bruno
2002:  (directed by Gilles Paquet-Brenner) - Tonton
2003: Les Thibault (TV Mini-Series) - Oscar Thibault
2004: Atomik circus: le retour de James Bataille (directed by Didier Poiraud and Thierry Poiraud)

Director
1972:  (Everybody's handsome, Everybody's Nice)
1972: Moi y'en a vouloir des sous
1973: Les Chinois à Paris
1975: Chobizenesse
1978: Je te tiens, tu me tiens par la barbichette
1982: Deux heures moins le quart avant Jésus-Christ
1984: Liberté, égalité, choucroute

References

External links

1933 births
2003 deaths
20th-century French male actors
French male film actors
French male television actors
French male screenwriters
French film producers
French film directors
French male composers
People from Les Lilas
Cannes Film Festival Award for Best Actor winners
20th-century French screenwriters
20th-century French male writers
20th-century French male musicians